Shaqaqi-ye Chavarzaq (also Romanized as Shaqāqī-ye Chavarzaq) is a village in Chavarzaq Rural District, Chavarzaq District, Tarom County, Zanjan Province, Iran. At the 2006 census, its population was 99, in 24 families.

References 

Populated places in Tarom County